The Chard and Ilminster News is a long-established local newspaper in Somerset, England.

History
The newspaper was established in Chard, Somerset, about 1874, as a weekly newspaper published on Saturdays, priced at one penny,
 and in 1882 was identified as Liberal-supporting, with a circulation of one thousand copies. It was then in competition with the longer-established Nowlen's Weekly Chronicle, Chard, Ilminster, and Axminster Gazette, which was Conservative and was selling 850 copies at a higher price.

Present day
The newspaper continues to be published weekly in Chard and covers the local news, events, jobs, births, deaths and marriages of Chard, Ilminster, Crewkerne, and the villages of South Somerset.

Notes

External links
Chard and Ilminster News, web site

Newspapers published in Somerset